Mother Nature Calls is the second album by the English band Cast, released on 14 April 1997 by Polydor. It spawned four singles: "Free Me", "Guiding Star", "Live the Dream" and "I'm So Lonely".

Critical reception

AllMusic's Stephen Thomas Erlewine was critical of Power's melodies lacking in memorability and his lyrics being "naive and [often] embarassingly simplistic" that the rest of the band can't convey it well, concluding that: "When the tunes and attitude are there, such weaknesses are easy to overlook, but since Cast comes up deficient on both counts, Mother Nature Calls is simply a dull listen."

In a retrospective review, Jamie Atkins of Record Collector said the album offered "more of the same" as its predecessor, "but considerably duller", bar the "shimmering Guiding Star, one of their better moments".

Track listing

Note
 "Dance of the Stars" ends at 6:25. After 13 minutes of silence (6:25–19:25), begins the hidden song "Soul Tied (Piano Loop)".

Ltd Edition with bonus CD (released December 1997)
 "Flying" (Original Version)
 "Walkaway" (Live in Manchester 1997)
 "Finetime" (Live in Manchester 1997)

Personnel
Cast
 John Power – vocals, guitar
 Peter Wilkinson – backing vocals, bass
 Liam "Skin" Tyson – guitar
 Keith O'Neill – drums

Production
 John Leckie – producer
 Mark "Spike" Stent – mixing
 Pete Lewis – mixing

Charts

Weekly charts

Year-end charts

Certifications

References

External links
 [ Mother Nature Calls at Billboard]

1997 albums
Cast (band) albums
Polydor Records albums
Albums produced by John Leckie